Within the Whirlwind is a 2009 German film directed by Marleen Gorris and based on the book by Yevgenia Ginzburg. It stars Emily Watson and Pam Ferris. Watson has described the film as "the most stretching thing I’ve done as a mature actress."

Plot
During Joseph Stalin's Great Purge, literature professor Yevgenia Ginzburg is falsely convicted of anti-Soviet agitation and sentenced to 10 years hard labor in a Soviet forced labour camp. Having lost everything, and no longer wishing to live, she meets Dr. Anton Walter (Ulrich Tukur), a Crimea German political prisoner who is a camp doctor in Kolyma. He recommends her for a position as a nurse in the camp infirmary. They fall in love and, slowly, Evgenia begins to come back to life.

Cast
Emily Watson as Yevgenia Ginzburg 
Pam Ferris as Genia's mother
Ian Hart as Beylin
Ben Miller as Krasny
Ulrich Tukur as Dr. Anton Walter

Distribution
As of 2011, Within the Whirlwind has not been picked up for distribution. According to Watson, "It was delivered pretty much the day the market crashed so nobody was buying anything. You have to be very Zen. Walk away and say: 'I have no idea what’s going to happen and it’s not in my hands.’ At the same time you never quite think that's going to happen."

References

External links

Bernd Reinhardt reviews the film for the, "World Socialist Website."
Ronnie Scheib reviews "Within the Whirlwind" for Variety.com

2009 films
English-language German films
English-language Belgian films
German drama films
Polish drama films
Belgian drama films
Films directed by Marleen Gorris
Films about the Soviet Union in the Stalin era
Works about the Gulag
Films shot in Cologne
Films based on autobiographies
2000s English-language films
2000s German films